Paul Stevens is the name of:

 Paul Stevens (actor) (1921–1986), American actor
 Paul Stevens (Australian footballer) (born 1953), Australian footballer 
 Paul Stevens (baseball) (born 1953), American college baseball coach
 Paul Stevens (bobsleigh) (1889–1949), American bobsledder
 Paul Stevens (cricketer) (born 1973), English cricketer
 Paul Stevens (English footballer) (born 1960), English footballer
 Paul Stevens (Friends), a fictional character
 Paul Schott Stevens (born 1952), American attorney